Calicium lenticulare is a crustose lichen that is found growing on trees in the South West region of Western Australia.

References

lenticulare
Lichen species
Lichens described in 1816
Taxa named by Erik Acharius
Lichens of Australia